Pluck Standing Stone is a standing stone and National Monument located in County Donegal, Ireland.

Location

History
Stone vessels have been dug up beneath and around Pluck Standing Stone.

References

National Monuments in County Donegal
Archaeological sites in County Donegal